Elections Saskatchewan is the non-partisan organization which oversees general elections and by-elections for the Legislative Assembly of Saskatchewan.

References

External links

Saskatchewan
Politics of Saskatchewan